Ghetto Bill: The Best Hustler in the Game is Master P's twelfth studio album and also his final released album with Koch Records.  It hit stores on June 21, 2005, and included the lead single "I Need Dubs" (featuring a sample of LL Cool J's hit "I Need Love").  The video for the track, which features Romeo, also includes a clip of the track "I'm Alright."  P also hooked up with mainstream artists Slim Thug on "Shut It Down" and G-Unit's "Young Buck" on the first street single, "Yappin'."  A video was shot for "Get the Party Crackin" which wound up being the album's final single.  Since its debut, "Ghetto Bill Vol. 1" has sold over 125,000 copies independently.

Track listing

Chart positions

Singles chart awards

I Need Dubs (ft. Romeo)

References

Master P albums
2005 albums
No Limit Records albums